The Tribal Museum of Bhopal is located close to the State Museum, Bhopal, near the Museum of Man/ Museum of Mankind in the Indian state of Madhya Pradesh.

Introduction
The tribal museum was designed by Revathi Kamath. It was inaugurated in 2013.
The museum is divided into six different themes galleries showcasing traditional art, craft and culture of various tribes of Madhya Pradesh like Gonds, Bhils, Bharias, Sahariya, Korku, Kol, and Baiga.

Major Galleries
The six galleries display various aspects of the tribal life.

1.	Jeevan Shaili - A gallery of homes’’’ showcases the homes of the Gond, Korku, Bhil and Sahariya tribes made up of mud, bamboo, dung, hay and grasses which also portrays the essentials such as agricultural tools, earthenware used by them. It highlighting their dependency on natural resources. 

2. Sanskritik Vaividhya - Cultural diversity well preserved exhibits different traditions associated with weddings and festivals of the tribal communities.

3. Kalabodh – The expression of tribal lifestyle in the form of art

4. Devlok- The house of gods exhibits different myths and beliefs associated with customs of worshipping mother earth, mountains, rivers, etc.

5. Chhattisgarh Dirgha depicts the tribal Art of Chhattisgarh

6. Rakku Dirgha - The story of how games originated exhibits traditional games, especially the ones played by children.

Other features
There is an amphitheater inside the museum which hosts scheduled plays, musical performances and folk dances. There is also a retail outlet of handicrafts and artefacts, called Chinhari. The museum also publishes an in-house magazine, Choumasa, about the tribal lifestyle.

References 

Museums in Madhya Pradesh 
Bhopal
Tourist attractions in Bhopal
Museums in Bhopal